Gamble House is a historic farmhouse located near Nesmith, Williamsburg County, South Carolina.  It dates to the early-19th century, and is a small wooden dwelling set upon brick piers with a steeply pitched gable roof. It consists of a central two-story core, with later additions of small one-story wings.

It was listed in the National Register of Historic Places in 1978.

References

Houses on the National Register of Historic Places in South Carolina
Houses in Williamsburg County, South Carolina
National Register of Historic Places in Williamsburg County, South Carolina